The 2015 Svijany Open was a professional tennis tournament played on clay courts. It was the 3rd edition of the tournament which was part of the 2015 ATP Challenger Tour. It took place in Liberec, Czech Republic between 3 and 9 August 2015.

Singles main-draw entrants

Seeds

 1 Rankings are as of 27 July 2015.

Other entrants
The following players received wildcards into the singles main draw:
  Roman Jebavý
  Václav Šafránek
  Robin Staněk

The following player entered using a protected ranking:
  José Checa Calvo

The following players received entry from the qualifying draw:
  Flavio Cipolla
  Mate Delić
  Juan Ignacio Londero
  César Ramírez

Champions

Singles

 Tobias Kamke def.  Andrej Martin 7–6(7–4), 6–4

Doubles

 Andrej Martin /  Hans Podlipnik def.  Wesley Koolhof /  Matwé Middelkoop 7–5, 6–7(3–7), [10–5]

External links
ITF Search
ATP official site

Svijany Open
2015 in Czech tennis
Sport in Liberec
August 2015 sports events in Europe
2015 ATP Challenger Tour